Lippitsch (German) or Lipič (Upper Sorbian) is a village in the northeast part of the German state Saxony, in the administrative district of Bautzen. It belongs to Upper Lusatia and was an independent municipality until 1977, when it was absorbed by Milkel. In 1999, it became part of the municipality Radibor. The population is 188.

The name comes from the Sorbian word, lipa for limetree. Lipič accordingly means place with a limetree.

References

Former municipalities in Saxony
Populated places in Bautzen (district)